As Sirr may refer to:

As Sirr, Saudi Arabia
As Sirr, Yemen